Ohene Djan (29 January 1924 – 26 March 1987) was a Ghanaian sports administrator. Ohene Djan was the First Director (Minister) of Sports of Ghana at the Central Organisation of Sports  (COS) and was also vice-president of the Confederation of African Football.

Early years and education
He was born on 29 January 1924 as one of the children of Mankrado Kwafo Kraba II and Aberewatia Juliana Yaa Amponsah Otoo alias Yaa Gyinae both from Aburi, Eastern Region. 
His education begun at the Aburi Presbyterian Primary School and Aburi Methodist Boarding School. He later continued to the Accra Academy where he obtained his secondary education, completing in 1943.

Career
After his secondary school education, he joined his father in his cocoa business. He worked with his father for a year and joined the civil service as a second division clerk. His father's deteriorating health forced him to resign in 1949 to manage his father's business. The agitation of 1950 resulted in Ohene Djan becoming an active member of the CPP; the political party founded by Kwame Nkrumah, the Ghanaian government head from 1951 to 1966. In the 1951 general elections he stood on the ticket of the CPP and was elected as its member for the Akuapem/New Juaben constituency beating Edward Akufo-Addo by 97 to 12 votes. In parliament he was appointed Ministerial Secretary (deputy minister) to the Ministry of Finance. He held that office until 1954 when he left Parliament due to corruption charges that were leveled against him.

Djan's journey to the helm of sports affairs in Ghana begun in September 1957, when he was elected General Secretary of the Football Association by the clubs and the Ghana Amateur Football Association (GAFA). 
He had led a revolution that had toppled the administration of Richard Akwei, a respected councillor of Accra, who had ruled football in Ghana - then known as Gold Coast officially since 1952 and unofficially for some years before then.

He founded the Black Stars, Ghana's famous national team, and he strategically affiliated the Association with FIFA in 1958 and the CAF in 1960. 
He was instrumental in securing sponsorship for the first Ghanaian FA Cup competition from a pharmaceutical firm, Merrs R.R. Harding and Company.
He succeeded in securing the services of an expatriate Coach, George Ainsley, for the National Team in that same year.
In 1958, he succeeded again in organizing the first national league, before Ghana became a republic on 1 July 1960.

In July 1960, Ghana's first President, Dr. Kwame Nkrumah, elevated Djan to the ministerial portfolio of 'Director of Sports' - the overall boss of sports administration in Ghana. He was in charge of the newly created Central Organisation of Sports  (COS) (now the Ministry of Youth and Sports (Ghana)), a sports ministry-like organization.
Although Djan left his GAFA chairmanship post due to this promotion, he continued to play a key role as General Secretary.

Djan's reputation grew on the continent, his lobbying helped Ghana gain the hosting rights for the 1963 African Cup of Nations which the Black Stars won (the Black Stars went on to defend the trophy in Tunisia in 1965 under his tenure of leadership). He also suggested to Nkrumah to donate a trophy for a tournament that is now known as the CAF Champions League. At a CAF extraordinary assembly in Addis Ababa he became second in command of the continent's highest football administrative body, emerging as CAF vice president alongside Ethiopia's Ydnekatchew Tessema in January, 1963. They both served under Egyptian Abdel Aziz Moustafa, the CAF president.
A year earlier, Djan had been voted unto the powerful FIFA Executive Committee (now known as the FIFA Executive Council). Sir Stanley Rous, FIFA's president then, described Djan as a 'valued' player at the World football governing body.

Aside football Ghana made giant strides in other sporting disciplines in his era as a Sports administrator. Ghana produced a silver medalist at the 1960 Summer Olympics in the name of Clement Quartey he became the first black African olympic medalist. Ghana was also the African country that won the most medals in the 1962 British Empire and Commonwealth Games.

Due to the influential role he played in Nkrumah's government, Djan was banned from public activities by the National Liberation Council, the military junta that undertook the coup of 1966, thus resulting in a loss of his place on the FIFA Executive Committee and subsequently, at CAF too.
With the spotlight dimmed, Djan's power and activeness declined, and he spent the ensuing years away from mainstream football politics.

The 1966 FIFA World Cup boycott
In January 1964, FIFA decided that the 16-team finals would be represented by 10 European teams, including hosts England, four Latin American (i.e. South America) teams and one team from the Central American and Caribbean region. This left just one place to be fought for by three continents: Africa, Asia and Oceania. Within a month, Ohene Djan, then a member of the FIFA executives committee objected.

He sent a telegram to FIFA condemning the decision and calling it "pathetic". Ohene Djan challenged FIFA to reconsider the decision since it was unrealistic for Afro-Asian countries to go through the exercise, struggling through painful and expensive qualifying series to ultimately be offered one slot to fight for.

Tessema joined Djan to present Africa's case to FIFA, arguing that football in Africa had significantly improved over the years. However, all efforts to revoke the decision in their favour proved futile. FIFA went on to organise the 1966 FIFA World Cup without an African representative. North Korea won the slot and they put up an impressive performance in the tournament. Moreover, Portugal's Eusébio, who was actually born in Mozambique, finished as top scorer. 

After the tournament, FIFA revised its notes and decided that Africa should have one slot for the next World Cup in Mexico. Today, African teams compete for five World Cup slots.

Legacy
Ghana's national stadium the Accra Sports Stadium is named after him in recognition of his contribution to sports in the country.

Death
Djan died on 26 March 1987.

See also
  BBC-Article with Image Ohene Djans , Retrieved on 8 November 2018.

References 

1924 births
1987 deaths
Ghanaian MPs 1951–1954
Alumni of the Accra Academy
Presidents of the Ghana Football Association
Ghanaian football chairmen and investors